Marcelo Lima may refer to:

 Marcelo Lopes (footballer, born 1975), Brazilian football defender
 Marcelo Lopes (footballer, born 1994), Portuguese football winger
 Marcelo Lopes de Souza, Brazilian professor of socio-spatial development and political ecology